The 2008 Espirito Santo Trophy took place 8–11 October at the Grange Golf Club (East and West Course) in Adelaide, South Australia, Australia. 

It was the 23rd women's golf World Amateur Team Championship for the Espirito Santo Trophy.

The tournament was a 72-hole stroke play team event. There were a tied record 48 team entries, each with three players.

Each team played two rounds at the East Course and two rounds at the West Course in different orders, but all leading teams played the fourth round at the West Course. The best two scores for each round counted towards the team total.

Sweden won the Trophy for their second title and the first wire-to-wire win seen in the championship in 18 years, beating team Spain by 12 strokes. Spain earned the silver medal while the United States team advanced, with two sub-70-scores in the last round, from fourth to third place and took the bronze medal another two strokes back.

With this championship, Sweden became the only team to have finished in the top-10 in all 23 editions of the Espirito Santo Trophy since the inaugural event in 1964.

The individual title went to 19-year-old Caroline Hedwall, Sweden, who, just as her team, lead wire-to-wire. Hedwall's score of 10-under-par, 280, was one stroke ahead of her teammate Anna Nordqvist. The third Swedish player, Pernilla Lindberg, finished 18th individually, despite none of her four rounds counted towards the team score.

Teams 
48 teams entered the event and completed the competition. Each team had three players.

Results 

Source:

Individual leaders 
There was no official recognition for the lowest individual scores.

References

External link 
World Amateur Team Championships on International Golf Federation website

Espirito Santo Trophy
Golf tournaments in Australia
Espirito Santo Trophy
Espirito Santo Trophy
Espirito Santo Trophy